This is an overview of the progression of the Olympic track cycling record of the women's team pursuit as recognised by the Union Cycliste Internationale (UCI).

The women's 3000m team pursuit discipline for 3 riders was introduced at the 2012 Summer Olympics. After the 2012–13 track cycling season the UCI changed the discipline into a format of 4000 m with 4 riders, as it will be at the 2016 Summer Olympics.

Progression
♦ denotes a performance that is also a current world record. Statistics are correct as of the end of the 2016 Summer Olympics.

3000 m (2012)

During the Qualification session there were several teams who rode a new best time and so had temporarily the Olympic Record. They are not listed as Olympic Record holders because they did not win the qualification session. These countries who had temporarily the Olympic record are:
 Heat 1: : Tatsiana Sharakova, Alena Dylko, Aksana Papko in a time of 3:22.850
 Heat 4: : Ellen van Dijk, Kirsten Wild, Amy Pieters in a time of 3:21.602
 Heat 6: : Tara Whitten, Gillian Carleton, Jasmin Glaesser in a time of 3:19.816
 Heat 7: : Sarah Hammer, Dotsie Bausch, Jennie Reed in a time of 3:19.406

4000 m (from 2016)
During the Qualification session there were several teams who rode a new best time and so had temporarily the Olympic Record. They are not listed as Olympic Record holders because they did not win the qualification session. These countries who had temporarily the Olympic record are:
 Heat 1: : Daria Pikulik, Edyta Jasińska, Justyna Kaczkowska, Natalia Rutkowska in a time of 4:28.988
 Heat 3: : Simona Frapporti, Tatiana Guderzo, Francesca Pattaro, Silvia Valsecchi in a time of 4:25.543
 Heat 4: : Lauren Ellis, Racquel Sheath, Rushlee Buchanan, Jaime Nielsen in a time of 4:20.061
 Heat 6: : Georgia Baker, Annette Edmondson, Amy Cure, Melissa Hoskins in a time of 4:19.059

References

Track cycling Olympic record progressions
Women's team pursuit (track cycling)